The Little Manitou River is a  stream in Lake County, Minnesota.  It flows directly into Lake Superior.

See also
List of rivers of Minnesota

References

Minnesota Watersheds
USGS Hydrologic Unit Map - State of Minnesota (1974)

Rivers of Minnesota
Tributaries of Lake Superior
Rivers of Lake County, Minnesota